Buelliella is a genus of fungi in the class Dothideomycetes. The relationship of this taxon to other taxa within the class is unknown (incertae sedis).

Species
Buelliella colombiana 
Buelliella dirinariae 
Buelliella eximia 
Buelliella heppiae 
Buelliella inops 
Buelliella lecanorae 
Buelliella minimula 
Buelliella physciicola 
Buelliella poetschii 
Buelliella protoparmeliopsis 
Buelliella pusilla 
Buelliella trypethelii

See also 
 List of Dothideomycetes genera incertae sedis

References

External links 
 Buelliella at Index Fungorum

Dothideomycetes enigmatic taxa
Dothideomycetes genera